Ifedayo Olusegun Patrick Omosouyi (born 14 January 1991) is a Nigerian-Bahraini professional footballer who plays as a forward.

Club career

Felda United
On 15 June 2017, Felda United have completed the signing of Omosuyi but the terms of the deal are concealed. Omosuyi has also played for Bahrain for five years making a massive impact in the club before being a free agent. Omosuyi scored three minutes into his debut for the club in their 2–1 victory over Terengganu in a mid-week friendly. Omosuyi scored a hat-trick as they thrashed Shahzan Muda 5–2 over the weekend friendly match. On 1 July 2017, Omosuyi scored his first goal for the team during his league debut playing against Pahang. Was not disconcerted by the intimidating crowd for Felda's Malaysia Cup semi-final game versus Kedah.

Return to Al Hidd, and Melaka
After his contract were not renewed by Felda, he signed for his former club Al-Hidd for the 2018 season. But in June 2018, he returned to Malaysia to sign for Melaka United.

Selangor

In mid of 2019 season on a second transfer window, Ifedayo has surprised official signed up for Selangor.

King Dayo, is a nickname given to him by Red Giants Selangor fans after he positioned himself as the top scorer and golden boot winner 2 times 2020 season and 2021 season with 26 goals in a row also break records for the most valuable professional import player in Malaysian football  history after the former teammates Rufino Segovia player was crowned top scorer of the 2018 season with 19 goals, adding the Best Foreign Player award, just five matches into the following campaign.

Career statistics

Club

Honours

Club 
Al-Hidd
Bahraini Premier League: 2015–16
Bahraini King's Cup: 2015
Bahraini FA Cup: 2015
Bahraini Super Cup: 2015

Individual 
PFAM Player of the Month (2): July 2018, May 2019
Malaysia Super League Top Scorers (2): 2020, 2021

References

External links
 

1991 births
Living people
Nigerian footballers
Felda United F.C. players
Malkiya Club players
Selangor FA players
Association football forwards
Nigerian expatriate footballers
Expatriate footballers in Bahrain
Nigerian expatriates in Bahrain
Expatriate footballers in Malaysia
Nigerian expatriates in Malaysia